("sacred embryo" or "embryo of sagehood") is a Chinese syncretic metaphor for achieving Buddhist liberation or Daoist transcendence. The Chan Buddhist teaching master Mazu Daoyi (709-788) first mentioned post-enlightenment  ("nurturing the sacred embryo"), and by the tenth century Chan monks were regularly described as recluses nurturing their sacred embryo in isolated locations. The renowned Daoist Zhang Boduan (984-1082) was first to use the expression  ("sagely embryo") in a context of physiological  Internal Alchemy, and  adepts developed prolonged meditation techniques through which one can supposedly become pregnant, gestate, and give birth to a spiritually perfected doppelganger.

Terminology
Chinese  is a linguistic compound of two common words:

peerless, incomparable, uniquely endowed; paragon; a conventional epithet for sovereign ….
possessing wisdom, judgment, and moral excellence; profoundly wise and virtuous; sage(ly), sagacious; [Buddhism] holy, sacred; holy person, saint ….
master practitioner of an art …
The second meaning can refer to Buddha or Buddhism, for instance,  ("become an ").

 
fetus, embryo; womb; something encapsulated like a fetus.
embryonic, fetal; source, origin; e.g., (Daoism)  , embryonic breathing, technique of "pneuma circulation"  xingqi in which an adept breathes in stillness, without using nose or mouth, as when in the womb; early stage of development; something in an unfinished state.
give birth to; spawn; congenital. … (Kroll 2017: 410, 484; condensed) 
Chinese  can ambiguously be translated as English embryo, fetus, or womb.

The unabridged  ("Comprehensive Chinese Word Dictionary"), which is lexicographically to the Oxford English Dictionary, defines  with two meanings:
 [Fetus/embryo of a sage/buddha.]
 [Alternate name for the pill of immortality in Daoist religion. The Internal Alchemy school uses a mother's body forming an embryo as a metaphor for the elixir made by condensing essence, and spirit, hence the name.] (1994, 8: 669).

There is no standard English translation for Chinese  and scholars have rendered it as:
"divine embryo" (Needham and Lu 1983: 85) 
"holy embryo" (Skar and Pregadio 2000: 481)
"Embryo of Sainthood" or "Sacred Embryo" (Darga 2008: 883)
"Embryo of Sainthood" (Despeux 2008: 954)
"sagely embryo" or "embryo of sainthood" (Despeux 2016: 149)
"sagely embryo" (Steavu 2016: 111)
"saintly embryo" (Pregadio 2018: 293)
"embryo of sagehood" (Buckelew 2018: 381)
"holy fetus" (Eskildsen 2019: 91)
"Autogestation" is Christine Mollier's unique translation, "the generation of an embryo of immortality, the germ of a perfect being, develops within the practitioner’s body through a process of 'autogestation' that can be labelled as an internal sexual alchemy" (2016: 87).

Indian Buddhism 

 is a Pali word (meaning "one who has thus come/gone") that Gautama Buddha uses when referring to himself or other Buddhas in the Pāli Canon, and translated as Chinese  ("thus come").  is a Sanskrit word (meaning "womb; fetus; embryo; child; interior; inside"), sharing the ambiguity of Chinese  ("womb; fetus; embryo").

In response, Buddhists also developed elaborate legends about the Buddha Śākyamuni's supernatural birth. His mother Queen Māyā supposedly was impregnated while dreaming that a white elephant entered her body, her pregnancy was painless, and the Buddha was born from underneath her right arm. These narrative elements helped establish the Buddha not only as different from ordinary people but more specifically as "impervious to the pollution and suffering understood to ordinarily accompany sexual intercourse, fetal gestation, and birth" (Buckelew 2018: 376).

Medieval Chinese Buddhism 
The  (Humane King Sutra), an apocryphal scripture composed around the fifth century during the Northern Wei dynasty (386–534), first used the expression  ("sagely embryo") describing the bodhisattva path towards attaining Buddhahood: "Buddhas and bodhisattvas cultivate and nourish the ten types of consciousness [ ] into a sagely embryo." (tr. Despeux 2016: 151). While Indian Buddhist texts described the bodhisattva path as consisting of ten sequential stages or "grounds" (Sanskrit , Chinese  ), the Chinese  expanded this sequence to include thirty additional preliminary stages or "minds", resulting in a much longer path towards enlightenment. These thirty minds that precede entry into the ten grounds, "constitute an intermediate sequence of stages during which the aspirant's sagehood is already 'conceived' but nevertheless still 'embryonic'". According to the Humane King Sutra, 
"In these [first ten minds], the bodhisattva is capable of transforming sentient beings in small measure and has already surpassed all of the good stages of the [lesser] two vehicles. All buddhas and bodhisattvas [in the course of their development] nurture these ten minds, which constitute an embryo of sagehood." (tr. Buckelew 2018: 378). 
Instead of the transitional  encompassing only the first ten minds, a subsequent passage more broadly associates it with all thirty, 
"[As for] the embryo of sagehood's thirty stages of patiently subduing [passions], [Namely] the ten faiths, ten cessations, and ten firm minds, Among all buddhas of the three times [past, present, and future] who have practiced within [them], There are none who were not born from this patient subjugation [of passions]." (tr. Buckelew 2018: 378). 
While buddha-nature refers to the universal buddhahood inherent in all sentient beings, the  discusses  as specifically referring to an exceptional aspirant's progress on sagely fetal growth along the bodhisattva path.

The Chinese term  never seems to have been used to translate the Sanskrit word  despite their apparent similarities. In Chinese Buddhism, "sage" (Sanskrit , Chinese  ) and "thus-come one" are standard epithets for buddhas; and both Sanskrit  and Chinese  can ambiguously mean either "womb" or "embryo". The most comprehensive Chinese-language collection of the Buddha's biographies, the sixth-century , uses the term  referring to the embryonic Buddha Śākyamuni within Queen Māyā's womb, which suggests that some Chinese Buddhists may have connected the embryo of sagehood to the Buddha's miraculous fetal gestation (Buckelew 2018: 380).

For example, the popular Chinese Buddhist saying that  (見性成佛, "seeing one's [buddha-]nature and becoming a buddha"). With the understanding that  ("becoming") a buddha is instantaneous, it is categorically all or nothing (Buckelew 2018: 381). On the other, a "soteriology of gradual development" was associated with the  "embryo (or womb) of sagehood". These verbs illustrate that  "the embryo of sagehood" retained closer semantic connections to literal embryology than did the "embryo of the thus-come one", which was understood in China as equivalent to buddha-nature. (Buckelew 2018: 381)

Vasubandhu's (Shiqin , fl. 300-400)  (Treatise on the Ten Stages Sutra) describes the Ten Stages of the original Indian Buddhist path of the bodhisattva as being "like pregnancy in a womb". The Chinese Buddhist scholar-monk Fashang (495–580) explains, 
"[The phrase] "like pregnancy in a womb" takes women as an example and takes pregnancy as a metaphor. In the first month, [a pregnant woman] carries the embryo, and after ten [lunar] months, [the embryo] is completely developed. Bodhisattvas are also like this: in the first ground, they attain the embryo of sagehood [], and in the tenth ground, the body of sagehood [] is completely developed." (tr. Buckelew 2018: 383) 
Instead of following the  sequence of thirty minds preceding entry into the ten grounds/stages, Fashang connects the embryo of sagehood to the earlier Indian Buddhist understanding of the unfolding bodhisattva path as consisting only of the ten grounds themselves, with each progressive month of pregnancy corresponding to one ground.

Practitioners who skillfully regulate these three matters cause [themselves] to be conceived within the womb of sagehood. Because the activity of their minds is not yet fully under their command, they ought to apply their minds to bringing together the father and mother of skillful means and the perfection of wisdom [respectively], who will conceive [them] within the womb of sagehood. Why would [such practitioners] allow themselves to be conceived within the wombs of denizens of hell, the three [unfortunate] destinies, or the realms of humans or gods? (tr. Buckelew 2018: 385-386) 
Zhiyi interprets  not just as an analogy for gradually growing enlightenment but as a literal site for rebirth, that should be considered highly preferable to rebirth in the destinies of samsara.

Zhiyi also uses  to explain  ("nonbirth-birth") that the  describes as "peacefully abiding in worldly truth, when someone first emerges from the womb, this is called 'nonbirth-birth'."
Now to explain "worldly truth." [This term refers to] when ignorance combines with dharma nature and all kinds of [mistaken] separations and distinctions are produced [in the mind]; thus it is called "worldly truth." As for "peacefully abiding," if by means of calming and contemplation [that is, meditation], one abides peacefully in worldly truth, then it [worldly truth] becomes an inconceivable object, and the stage of practicing observation is completed; thus it is called "peacefully abiding." Because one peacefully abides, [this stage of practice] is called "being conceived within the womb of sagehood." When one first activates one's buddha knowledge and [buddha] vision and recognizes that [all things] are unborn, this stage is called "exiting [or, being born from] the womb of sagehood." Because [at this stage] one does not see worldly truth [through the lens of] ignorance, [the sutra] says "not born." Because one obtains buddha knowledge and buddha vision, [the sutra] says "born." The [Great Wisdom] Treatise says: "all  are not born, but  is born," which is the [same] meaning [as the sutra's nonbirth-birth]. (tr. Buckelew 2018: 387) 
Zhiyi's disciple Guanding (561–632) explains that "Peacefully abiding in worldly truth" has two meanings. Exoterically, it denotes the time from first thinking of conception in a womb until death. Esoterically, it means a bodhisattva who is at the stage of cultivating skillful means, which reiterates Zhiyi's notion of worldly truth as a womb within which the practitioner grows as a bodhisattva. "When cultivation gives rise to realization and ignorance is destroyed, this [moment] constitutes the first emergence from the womb; it is also nirvana, which is beginningless and yet is said thenceforth to begin. (tr. Buckelew 2018: 388)

Chan Buddhism 

With the rise of Chan Buddhism from the Tang through Song dynasties, Buddhist religious authority began to shift from translated and apocryphal Buddhist scriptures to the recorded sayings of indigenous Chinese Chan masters, and Chan tradition emphasized sudden over gradual enlightenment, namely,  ("seeing one's [buddha-]nature and [instantly] becoming a buddha") (Buckelew 2018: 392).

The 952  (Anthology of the Patriarchal Hall) version mentions  ("Nurturing the Sacred Embryo"):
 What the heart/mind produces is called form. When one realizes that form is empty, production becomes nonproduction. Having understood this, one can act according to circumstances, dressing, eating, developing and maintaining the sagely embryo, and living in harmony with spontaneity. (tr. Despeux 2016: 152)) 

The Tang scholar-monk Guifeng Zongmi (780-841), fifth patriarch of the Heze school in Southern Chan Buddhism, criticizes the apparent contradiction between Mazu's using the  sacred embryo trope while claiming that enlightenment is instantaneous and need not be developed, Zongmi asks, "[Buddha-]nature is like empty space, neither growing nor diminishing. By what means could it be supplemented?" (tr. Buckelew 2018: 394). Zongmi also mentions "feeding the soul and making the sagely embryo grow []" in his  (Preface to a Collection of Texts on the Origins of Chan") (Despeux 2016: 152). 
Gufeng Zongmi notes the figurative resemblance between the embryo of sagehood and the impregnation of the storehouse consciousness—the eighth of the Eight Consciousnesses in the Yogācāra philosophical tradition, which is said to store the impressions of previous experiences, which form the seeds of future karma in this life and in subsequent rebirths. His later commentary on the Sutra of Perfect Enlightenment says, the "awakened mind is the embryo of sagehood".
When by means of but a single thought one awakens to this perfect and wondrous mind, the storehouse consciousness is thereupon impregnated with the seed of sagehood [], though conditions have not yet brought it to external manifestation; thus, it is like the beginning of pregnancy. (tr. Buckelew 2018: 390-391) 
Although Zhiyi (above) argued that the embryo of sagehood could be conceived through nothing more than proper meditation, Zongmi equated the embryo of sagehood with the awakened mind, metaphysically explained as the seeds of Buddhahood impregnating one's storehouse consciousness in order attain liberation (Buckelew 2018: 392).

By the tenth century, it became increasingly common for Chan monks to be described as recluses nurturing the embryo of sagehood in isolated forests or on mountains. For example, the poet-monk Qiji  (860–940) describes "sitting on stones, gazing at clouds, and nurturing the embryo of sagehood." Elsewhere, he recounts a trip to the stone bridge deep in the Tiantai Mountain mountains in search of the legendary Eighteen Arhats, who he imagines "sitting together on green cliffs, nurturing the embryo of sagehood." (Buckelew 2018: 396).

According to the 988  (Song-dynasty Biographies of Eminent Monks), when the wandering monk Zhifeng met Yuquan Shenxiu (605–706), "… the ice of his doubts melted away" and he decided to "nurture the embryo of sagehood []." He moved to the Anfeng mountains (present-day Shanxi), where he passed ten years, "eating from trees and drinking from streams." After the provincial governor Wei Wen learned of Zhifeng, he invited him to return to the city, where he took up abbacy of the new Anguo Monastery. "From that time on, he rushed about [performing public duties] in the padded robes [of a city monk]." (tr. Buckelew 2018: 398). Subsequently, it became a literary trope that after a Chan monk's enlightenment was certified through lineage transmission, they would nurture the embryo of sagehood during a period of reclusion or aimless wandering before returning to public life (Buckelew 2018: 397).

After the early Chinese Buddhist reception of the "embryo of sagehood" was guided by the metaphysics of spiritual pregnancy and buddha bodies, Chan Buddhists gave the concept a more markedly metaphorical character, and Daoist Inner Alchemy, which emerged closely after the rise of Chan, gave  a new role of embodiment in the pursuit of religious liberation (Buckelew 2018: 401).

Daoist Internal Alchemy 

During the Tang dynasty (618-907), the Daoist practice of psychophysiological  (Internal/Inner Alchemy/Elixir) began to supersede the ancient, and sometimes dangerous, practice of chemical  (External/Outer Alchemy/Elixir). Daoist Internal Alchemy practitioners developed the term  "sacred embryo" into a complex process of symbolic pregnancy generating a spiritually perfected duplicate of oneself within oneself, which later became synonymous with the elixir of immortality in External Alchemy. This alchemical embryo "represents a new life, true and eternal in its quality" (Darga 2008: 883). 

In Internal Alchemy, the "sagely embryo" is an amalgam of Buddhist ideas concerning latent spiritual qualities that are developable through a symbolic birth leading to awakening, and Daoist ideas of accessing immortality through  ("reversion") to the cosmic matrix.  ("return; reversion; inversion") is a basic concept in Daoist  alchemical literature, for example, the term  ("Returning to the embryo") refers to mentally repeating one's embryonic development, emphasizing "the return of the physical freshness and perfect vital force of infancy, childhood, and even fetal life" (Needham and Lu 1983: 135). Returning to the origin, the womb, or the embryo implies the idea of "rebirth and renewal as a kind of countercurrent to ordinary life" (Robinet 1993: 112). In distinction to Buddhism emphasizing the spiritual or psychological dimensions of an adept's experience, Daoism focuses upon corporeal metaphors for the physical or psychophysiological sensations such as inner breathing, inner flows, and inner heat (Despeux 2016: 153).

Although the gestational motif appears in Internal Alchemy texts around the middle of the Tang, it derives from earlier Buddhist (mentioned above) and Daoist contexts. Many Daoist classics mention embryonic and gestational motifs. A famous example is the circa fourth century BCE  praising infancy. "He who embodies the fullness of integrity is like a ruddy infant []. Wasps, spiders, scorpions, and snakes will not sting or bite him; Rapacious birds and fierce beasts will not seize him." (55, tr. Mair 1990: 24). "By being a ravine for all under heaven, Eternal integrity will never desert you []. If eternal integrity never deserts you, You will return to the state of infancy []" (28, tr. Mair 1990: 93); which suggests that "human vitality is fully charged upon parturition and constantly discharges with every natural cycle of breath" (Yang 2015: 158).

The circa mid-second century CE  (Token for the Agreement of the Three According to the Book of Changes), a fundamental treatise on Inner Alchemy, poetically describes the birth of a spiritual embryo, which is usually connected with its transcendence of the mortal body.
Similar in kind to a hen’s egg, the white [Yang] and the black [Yin] tally with one another. It is only one inch in size, but it is the beginning [of the sagely embryo]. Then, the four limbs, the five viscera, the sinews and bones join it. When the ten months have elapsed, it leaves its womb.  Its bones are weak and pliant, its flesh is smooth like lead. (tr. Despeux 2016: 148) 
Although Daoist texts describe body-centered meditations that recall the various stages of embryonic development, they are nevertheless describing psychological or spiritual processes.

The Shangqing School scriptures, believed to have been revealed to Yang Xi in the late fourth-century, developed these practices into formalized and complex meditative procedures for visualizing one's own spiritual rebirth (Buckelew 2018: 402).

The fourth or fifth century  (Commentary to the Scripture on the Inner Effulgences of the Yellow Court) has one of the earliest references to an allegorical embryo, "the embryo-immortal [] dances to the three couplets of the heart-lute." (tr. Despeux 2016: 149).

The circa ninth-century  (Scripture of the Nine Transcendents and the Perfected Dragon and Tiger), which contains commentaries attributed to Ye Fashan (616–720) and Luo Gongyuan (618-758), instructs an adept to "imagine the true essence of the two kidneys merging into a single  and the blood of the heart descending to combine [with it], whereupon the image of the infant is formed." And the Luo-attributed commentary says that after creating the embryo of sagehood, one must fully refine the body of sagehood for ten months, after which it is capable of exiting the practitioner's physical body "from the crown of the head riding on a purple cloud and that it constitutes a second body identical in appearance to the material body." (Buckelew 2018: 403-404).

Beyond this, texts of different eras define the embryo and explain its formation in various ways. (Darga 2008: 884).

The late Tang  (Record of the Transmission of the Way from Zhong[li Quan] to Lü [Dongbin]) describes how "the medicinal ingredients of the  inner elixir come from the heart and kidneys, which all people possess." By combining them within oneself according to the proper timing and procedures, one "appropriates the efficacy of sexual intercourse between husband and wife, so that the embryo of sagehood is completed and true  is born." As a result, "when the great medicine is complete, the yang spirit emerges and there is a body outside the body, like a cicada shedding its skin." This passage mixes alchemical and sexual themes.

Zhang Boduan (987-1082), one of the most famous Inner Alchemists of the Song period, was the first to use the expression  ("sagely embryo") in the context of Internal Alchemy, and the first to have explicitly referred to a symbolic pregnancy process (Despeux 2016: 149). Even though Zhang extensively studied Chan texts, his work was "a synthesis of Buddhist and Daoist methods in which the former are assimilated to the latter, so that the final package is essentially Daoist" (Capitanio 2015: 139). This is illustrated in the legend of Zhang Boduan’s contest with a rival Buddhist master to see who could travel farther in an externalized spiritual body. The monk's Yin Spirit could leave his body during meditative trances, and after travelling to a faraway land and returning, he described its beautiful flowers. Not to be outdone, Zhang’s Yang Spirit travelled to the same place the monk described, plucked an actual flower and returned with it. "In the great way of the Golden Elixir, life and nature are jointly cultivated. Thus, by accumulation, the body is accomplished, and by dispersion,  is accomplished. In the place to which he travelled, Zhang’s perfected soul was manifested in a body. This is what is called the ‘Yang Spirit.’" (Despeux 2016: 177).

Zhang Boduan's 1075  (Folios on Awakening to Perfection) defines the embryo as the energy of the One. In this text, the embryo also represents the female within the male, i.e., the Yin of the human being that is enclosed and transformed by the Yang (Darga 2008: 884). "When the three families [essence, and soul] meet, the infant coalesces; the Infant is the One, holding true . […] After ten months, the embryo is complete; this is the foundation for entering sagehood." (tr. Despeux 2016: 176-177).

The 1078  (Master Chen's Formulas on the Internal Elixir) details how the sagely embryo transforms into the adept's physically and mentally identical doppelganger:
When the numinous rotation [] occurs in the sagely embryo, the face of the immortal is produced. The commentary says: "At the third revolution [of the Elixir], Yang is nourished and the visionary  soul arises in the sagely embryo. At the fourth revolution, Yin is nourished and the  soul arises. The egress of the spirit is [the emergence of] one's true self." (tr. Despeux 2016: 167) 

Chen Niwan  (fl. twelfth century) describes egressing his spirit through the fontanel: "I have put into practice the work of old for a full year, and the six vessels have already stopped, the breath has returned to its root, and in the [lower] Cinnabar Field there is an infant. Its body and appearance are similar to mine." Then comes the climax of the entire process: "As this infant grows, [there comes a point when it] cannot reside in this cavity [of the lower Cinnabar Field] any longer; so a fissure and then an orifice naturally appear, and it emerges through the top of the head. This is known as 'exiting and leaving the sea of sufferings.'" (tr. Despeux 2016: 178)

After various embryonic transformations, practitioners of Internal Alchemy are supposedly reborn as perfected, luminous replicas of themselves. Men and women both refine their bodies into Pure Yang, eliminating all Yin to the extent that they no longer even have a shadow (or  ). That which they generate within themselves is not strictly the ethereal body of a transcendent because it is also visible to others (Despeux 2016: 177).
Subsequent Song (960-1279) and Yuan (1271–1368) inner alchemists, such as Xue Daoguang  (1078?–1191) and Chen Zhixu  (b. 1290), both praised Chan Buddhism but explicitly criticized the widespread notion that  ("seeing one's own buddha-nature") alone is sufficient to turn one into a buddha (Buckelew 2018: 406). 

 texts of the Ming period (1368-1644) frequently compare the development of the embryo to the revelation of Buddhahood. Thus, the true inner nature and vital force come into being, which in turn is equated to the return to emptiness.

Lastly, the embryo is related to the Inner Alchemy practice of Taixi (embryonic breathing), which denotes breathing like a child in the womb. Daoists have developed various methods of embryonic breathing but most of them share the fundamental idea that breath nourishes the body by circulating through its vital centers (Darga 2008: 884). To "breathe like an embryo" refers to a manner of respiration that does not involve the nose or the mouth but rather the pores of the skin. This expression may also denote the sensations experienced by adepts of something expanding and contracting, or "breathing" somewhere inside their bodies. (Despeux 2016: 163).

The Chinese Buddhist concept of the  "embryo of sagehood" originated in medieval China as a trope describing the complex bodhisattva path invented in the apocryphal Humane King Sutra. This doctrine was differentiated from the better known and linguistically similar Indian Buddhist  ("embryo of the Buddha") concept that came to be equated with buddha-nature in China. The embryo of sagehood implies the "need not only to see one's inherent buddha-nature but also to nurture a buddhahood that has to be conceived, gestated, and birthed." In Chan Buddhism, nurturing the embryo of sagehood became a metaphor for a liminal period of idealized mountain and forest reclusion undertaken by enlightened masters who were still awaiting appointment to an abbacy. Daoist inner alchemists combined early Shangqing School sacred embryology with contemporaneous Chinese Buddhist conceptions about the sacred embryo, resulting in a belief that a practitioner could conceive, gestate, and give birth to a supernatural body (Buckelew 2018: 409).

See also
Doppelgänger
Homunculus
Tulpa

References
Buckelew, Kevin (2018), "Pregnant Metaphor: Embryology, Embodiment, and the Ends of Figurative Imagery in Chinese Buddhism", Harvard journal of Asiatic Studies 2.78: 371-411.
Capitanio, Joshua (2015), "Portrayals of Chan Buddhism in the Literature of Internal Alchemy", Journal of Chinese Religions 43.2, 119-160.
Darga, Martina (2008), "  Embryo of Sainthood; Sacred Embryo", in Fabrizio Pregadio (ed.), The Encyclopedia of Taoism, Routledge, 883-884.
Despeux, Catherine (2008), "  embryonic breathing," in Fabrizio Pregadio (ed.), The Encyclopedia of Taoism, Routledge, 953-954.
Despeux, Catherine (2016), "Symbolic pregnancy and the sexual identity of Taoist adepts", in Anna Andreeva and Dominic Steavu (eds.), Transforming the Void. Embryological Discourse and Reproductive Imagery in East Asian Religions, Brill, 147-185.
Eskildsen, Stephen (2019), "Neidan Methods for Opening the Gate of Heaven", in Internal Alchemy: Self, Society, and the Quest for Immortality, Three Pines Press, 87-103.
Irons, Edward A., ed. (2008), Encyclopedia of Buddhism, Checkmark Books.
Mollier, Christine (2016), " Conceiving the Embryo of Immortality: 'Seed-People' and Sexual Rites in Early Taoism", in Anna Andreeva and Dominic Steavu (eds.), Transforming the Void. Embryological Discourse and Reproductive Imagery in East Asian Religions, Brill, 87-110.
Needham, Joseph and Lu Gwei-djen (1983), Science and Civilisation in China: Volume 5, Part 5, Chemistry and Chemical Technology Spagyrical Discovery and Invention: Physiological Alchemy, Cambridge University Press.
Pregadio, Fabrizio (2018), "Which is the Daoist Immortal Body?", Micrologus 26: 385-407.
Robinet, Isabelle (1993), Taoist Meditation: the Mao-shan Tradition of Great Purity, tr. by Julian F. Pas and, Norman J. Giradot, State University of New York. 55-96 Huangting jing
Skar, Lowell and Fabrizio Pregadio (2000), "Inner Alchemy," in Livia Kohn, ed., Daoism Handbook, Brill, 464-497.
Steavu, Dominic (2016), "Cosmos, Body, and Gestation in Taoist Meditation", in Anna Andreeva and Dominic Steavu (eds.), Transforming the Void. Embryological Discourse and Reproductive Imagery in East Asian Religions, Brill, 111-185.

External links
Neidan Dictionary, embryo of sainthood; saintly embryo; sacred embryo, The Golden Elixir

Buddhist philosophical concepts
Chinese philosophy
Meditation 
Religion in China
Taoist practices